Nicarao was said to be the name of an indigenous chieftain or cacique who presided over a territory in southwestern Nicaragua during the early 16th century. Based on research done by historians in 2002, it was discovered that his real name was Macuilmiquiztli.

Background 
Christopher Columbus, on his 4th and last voyage in 1502, explored the eastern coast of what is now known as Nicaragua but did not venture to its western coast, nor did he come into contact with any indigenous people. In 1522, the Spanish conquistador Gil González Dávila left Panama with 100 men, beginning the first incursion into the western regions of Costa Rica and Nicaragua. When they arrived in southwestern Nicaragua, they encountered a Nahuat-speaking tribe, and with the help of two indigenous interpreters who had come with González Dávila, he was able to have a discourse with the tribe's cacique, who has since been commonly referred to by the name Nicarao.

The territory or cacicazgo ruled over by Nicarao was situated in the isthmus of what is now known as Nicaragua's Rivas Department, next to Lake Nicaragua, and it extended southward to what is now known as the Guanacaste Province in northwestern Costa Rica. The tribe's capital city or principal settlement was called Quauhcapolca, though it has sometimes been referred to in history books as Nicaraocallí, and it is believed to have been situated near the modern lake port of San Jorge.

According to a once-popular theory, the name "Nicaragua" was derived from a portmanteau of the name Nicarao and the Spanish word agua which means "water", due to the presence of two large lakes and other bodies of water in the country.

Name controversy 
In 2002, through the research done by two Nicaraguan historians working independently of each other, it was argued that the true name of the cacique was actually Macuilmiquiztli, which meant "Five Deaths" in the Nahuatl language.

It is not known how the name Nicarao came to be associated with the cacique Macuilmiquiztli. It is possible that the Spanish conquistadors derived the name Nicarao based on the ethnicity of his tribe, which was composed of Pipil-Nicarao people, who were a branch of Nahuas. Andrés de Cereceda, the treasurer of González Dávila's expedition, wrote in his log the names of the caciques of the villages where gold was collected. In the vicinity of Costa Rica's Gulf of Nicoya, they found the largest indigenous village they had visited, which was ruled by a cacique named Chorotega. Since then, linguistic sources have used the name of that cacique as an eponym, "Chorotega people ", to encompass a number of villages which had cultural and linguistic similarities despite being physically separated.

References

History of Nicaragua